Nancy Weber (born 1942 in Hartford, Connecticut) is an American writer.

Photo and information in the online  search is not of this writer. It is of Nancy Orlen Weber who is a different writer.

Works

Weber is known primarily for her non-fiction work The Life Swap (1974; re-issued 2006).  Her twenty-some other books include The Playgroup (1982) and Brokenhearted (1989), both speculative novels with medical themes, and eight romances written under the name Jennifer Rose.

Weber's works in progress include Seagull: The Musical, with composer Alexander Zhurbin, and Party Math, the how much and how many of entertaining, with artist Richard Pitts.

Personal life
Weber is the mother of two grown children and lives in New York.

Under the name "Between Books She Cooks", she caters parties and teaches cooking.

External links
 "Ring Cycle, Last Act", short story at Underground Voices

20th-century American novelists
21st-century American novelists
American women novelists
1942 births
Living people
20th-century American women writers
21st-century American women writers
American women non-fiction writers
20th-century American non-fiction writers
21st-century American non-fiction writers
Loomis Chaffee School alumni